Take It to the Limit is an album by Willie Nelson with Waylon Jennings, released in 1983 on Columbia Records.

Background
Take It to the Limit was the third Jennings/Nelson duet album and the second to be produced by Chips Moman.  Whereas their previous album together, 1982's WWII, had contained more Waylon solo tracks, this LP includes five tracks sung solely by Willie.  The title actually reads Wille Nelson with Waylon Jennings, likely the result of the LP being released on Nelson's label CBS (the previous two duet albums had been released on RCA).  The title song was written by Eagles' members Randy Meisner, Don Henley and Glenn Frey and performed by the Eagles on their 1975 album, One of These Nights, while "Homeward Bound" was originally by Simon & Garfunkel. Take It to the Limit was the next-to-last collaboration between Jennings and Nelson; of the four duets albums released by the singers, 1978's Waylon & Willie achieved the greatest success.  Despite the fact that neither singer was in top artistic form and Jennings' most successful days were already over, the record managed to chart, peaking at #3, as did WWII.  "Why Do I Have to Choose" also reached #3, while the title track reached #8 on the singles chart.

Reception
In his review of the album for AllMusic, James Chrispell writes, "it sounds like these two hombres are just plain tired and saddle-sore from all the high riding days of the past. Most of the tunes are covers of previous hits by other artists and have little in association with what Willie (or Waylon) are about except for their take on George Jones' "Why Baby Why." By this time, fans were beginning to say the same thing."  Author Joe Nick Paroski stated in his 2008 book Willie Nelson that the LP "reflected a growing distance.  The effort sounded half-hearted, as if they were recording together only because it made good business, and it clocked in at a mere thirty-four minutes."

Track listing
"No Love at All" (Johnny Christopher, Wayne Carson Thompson) – 2:42
"Why Do I Have to Choose" (Willie Nelson) – 3:12
"Why Baby Why" (Darrell Edwards, George Jones) – 2:40
"We Had It All" (Donnie Fritts, Troy Seals) – 3:06
"Take It to the Limit" (Randy Meisner, Glenn Frey, Don Henley) – 3:46
"Homeward Bound" (Paul Simon) – 3:29
"Blackjack County Chain" (Red Lane) – 2:59
"'Til I Gain Control Again" (Rodney Crowell) – 4:57
"Old Friends" (Roger Miller) – 3:33
"Would You Lay with Me (In a Field of Stone)" (David Allan Coe) – 3:16

Production
Producer: Chips Moman
Art Direction: Virginia Team
Cover Illustration Bill Imhoff
Photo of Willie: Charlyn Zlotnick
Photo of Waylon: Beverly  Parker

Personnel
Willie Nelson - guitar, vocals, harmony vocals
Gene Christman, Paul English - drums
Mike Leach, Bee Spears - bass guitar
Waylon Jennings, Chips Moman, Reggie Young, Grady Martin, Johnny Christopher - guitar
Bobbie Nelson, Bobby Wood - keyboards
Jon Marett - saxophone
Waylon Jennings, Toni Wine, Lisa Silver, Harry Huffman, Chips Moman, Bobby Wood, Johnny Christopher, David Allan Coe, Garry Talley - harmony vocals

Chart performance

Waylon Jennings albums
Willie Nelson albums
1983 albums
Albums produced by Chips Moman
Columbia Records albums
Vocal duet albums
Collaborative albums
Covers albums